Petalidi is a village and a former municipality in Messenia, Peloponnese, Greece. Since the 2011 local government reform it is part of the municipality Messini, of which it is a municipal unit. The municipal unit has an area of 104.970 km2. Petalidi is situated on the western shore of the Messenian Gulf, 14 km southwest of Messini, 20 km southwest of Kalamata and 25 km east of Pylos. The road Greek National Road 82 (Pylos – Kalamata) passes through the north of the municipal unit. Its population is about 1,300 inhabitants.

Petalidi is a touristic place in Messinia, visited mostly in summer months. Landmarks of the village are: The central square with the Church of Agios Nikolaos, the seafront, the lighthouse, the park on the port, the fount of Liar (η βρύση του ψεύτη in Greek) and the football field beside the sea.

Subdivisions
The municipal unit Petalidi is subdivided into the following communities (2011 population in brackets):
Achladochori (pop: 334)
Daras (pop: 293)
Drosia (pop: 75)
Kalochori (pp: 133)
Karpofora (pop: 176)
Kastania (pop: 44)
Kokkino (pop: 83)
Lykissa (pop: 71)
Mathia (pop: 60)
Neromylos (pop: 324)
Paniperi (pop: 380)
Petalidi (pop: 1,244)

Historical population

References

See also

List of settlements in Messenia

Populated places in Messenia
Mediterranean port cities and towns in Greece